The 2010 German Figure Skating Championships took place on December 17–20, 2009 at the SAP Arena in Mannheim. Skaters competed in the disciplines of men's singles, ladies' singles, pair skating, and ice dancing on the senior, junior, and novice levels. The results were among the criteria used to choose the German teams to the 2010 World Championships and the 2010 European Championships.

Medalists

Senior

Junior

Novice

Senior results

Men

 WD = Withdrawn

Ladies

 WD = Withdrawn

Pairs

Ice dancing

 WD = Withdrawn

Junior results

Men

Ladies

 WD = Withdrawn

Pairs

Ice dancing

Novice results

Pairs

 WD = Withdrawn

Ice dancing

External links
 2010 German Championships: Senior, junior, novice pairs, and novice ice dancing results
 2010 German Championships: Youth and novice singles results
  

German Championships
German Figure Skating Championships
Figure Skating Championships